Patagoniaemys is an extinct genus of stem turtle which existed in central Patagonia, Chubut Province, Argentina during the late Cretaceous epoch (Campanian to Maastrichtian age). It is known from skull fragments and several postcranial elements including a nearly complete vertebral column recovered from the La Colonia Formation. It was first named by Juliana Sterli and Marcelo S. de la Fuente in 2011, and the type species is Patagoniaemys gasparinae.

References

Prehistoric turtle genera
Late Cretaceous turtles
Campanian life
Maastrichtian life
Prehistoric turtles of South America
Cretaceous Argentina
Fossils of Argentina
Cañadón Asfalto Basin
Fossil taxa described in 2011
Meiolaniformes